is a Japanese slice of life romance shōjo manga series written and illustrated by Tōko Minami and serialized on Shueisha's Bessatsu Margaret magazine. It is a sequel to the 2013 oneshot Mebuki Kimidori. First volume was released on July 25, 2013 and it concluded in 2016 with 11 volumes.

Plot
When she was 5 years old Ririko lost her mother and has been since helping her father with his handyman business. When her father is hospitalized, she goes on a job for him and her client is none other than Minato Suoh, a rich high school student who lives alone. Although it's originally a one-time job, Ririko eventually begins to cook and do odd jobs for Minato on a regular basis since he can barely look after himself and in return Minato sometimes lends a hand with her father's business.

Characters
Ririko Hayakawa
Ririko is an energetic and hardworking 15-year-old, who on top of going to high school, also cooks, cleans and looks after her little brother. She lost her mother when she was five and being the only girl in her house, has since taken on a mother-like role. When her father is hospitalized, she decides to do his work for him while he is sick and this is how she meets Minato. She is shown to be kind and considerate towards others such as how she cooks and cleans for Minato even though he irritates her with his spoilt personality. She is always busy with jobs and for the first part of the manga, she only meets Minato at the train station until he gives her his spare phone so they can keep in touch. She often puts others before herself, for example, although she originally likes Kuba-san, when she realises he has feelings for Yuzuka she encourages him to tell her how he feels before it's too late. Later on she gets a shock when she sees Minato at the train station with a girl clinging to him, although we can't tell whether this is jealously or not, she seems upset. She cares a lot for Minato and is gradually becoming good friends with him. Later on in the future, they begin dating and eventually get married and have a daughter.
Minato Suoh
Minato is a spoilt 15-year-old high school student who lives alone in a large apartment complex. In chapter 3.5, we learn that he wanted to live alone when he started high school but before he left he had an argument with his father, leading to him being cut off from the family. All the maids and cleaners he ordered to be sent from his home were cancelled by his father so his apartment is still filled with boxes because it is too 'troublesome' for him to unpack them. However he still has his credit cards and uses them frequently. It is stated he lost his mother a few years before the start of the manga although it is not stated what age he was or how exactly she died. He seems to have been raised in a very wealthy lifestyle as he does not know how to cook or look after himself. At one point, it's said he hasn't eaten since the last time Ririko fed him the day before. He is also very flippant about money as he buys a whole new wardrobe just because he isn't bothered unpacking. It seems as though he cares a lot for Ririko such as giving her a phone, possibly because he's worried about her and he is shown to be caring about her family, especially her dad when he's sick. He and Ririko date later on and get married. He then has a daughter with Ririko.
Rui Hayakawa
Rui is Ririko's younger brother.
Yuuma Saiki
Minato's best friend.
Koizumi Tadamori
Minato's friend who plays the violin during music lessons together.

Volumes
1 (July 25, 2013)
2 (November 25, 2013)
3 (March 25, 2014)
4 (July 25, 2014)
5 (November 25, 2014)
6 (February 25, 2015)
7 (June 25, 2015)
8 (October 23, 2015)
9 (February 25, 2016)
10 (June 24, 2016)
11 (October 25, 2016)

Reception
Volume 2 reached the 16th place on the weekly Oricon manga chart and, as of December 1, 2013, has sold 54,621 copies; volume 3 reached the 11th place and, as of April 6, 2014, has sold 95,334 copies; volume 4 reached the 16th place and, as of August 3, 2014, has sold 96,901 copies. The final and 11th volume debuted at #8 with 76,565 copies sold in its first week.

References

External links
Official website 

2013 manga
Romance anime and manga
Shōjo manga
Shueisha manga
Slice of life anime and manga
2016 comics endings